The Brehon Law Commission was established in 1852 to translate the Senchus Érenn, a collection of early Irish legal tracts more commonly known as the Brehon Laws, a corrupted transliteration of the Irish word breatheamuin. James Henthorn Todd and Charles Graves had submitted an appeal to the short-lived British Conservative government in 1852.

Composition of the Commission
The Commission started its work on 7th December 1852 with the following members:

 James Henthorn Todd
 Charles Graves
 George Petrie
 Thomas Larcom
 David Richard Pigot
 Francis Blackburne
 Baron Monteagle
 Sir Joseph Napier
 Edwin Wyndham-Quin
 William Parsons, 3rd Earl of Rosse
 Lord Talbot de Malahide
 Thomas Romney Robinson

References

Early Gaelic law